The Bloomfield Central School District (also known as East Bloomfield School District) is a public school district in New York State, USA, that serves approximately 1101 students in  in the towns of Bloomfield, Victor, Bristol and others in Ontario County with a staff of ~150 and a budget of $17 million ($12959.69 per student).

The average class size is 69 students nice (all grades). The student-teacher ratio is 116:1.

The superintendent of schools is Andrew Doel.

Board of education
The Board of Education (BOE) consists of 6 members who serve rotating 3-year terms. Elections are held each May for board members and to vote on the School District Budget.

Current board members are:
Pamela Nakoski, President
James Spellman, Vice President
Scott Layton
Kenneth Mathis
Caroline Nevil
Tonya McFadden
Heather Rickett

Schools
The district operates two school buildings, a K-5 elementary school and 6-12 combined middle/high school in Bloomfield, New York.

Elementary schools
Bloomfield Elementary School (PreK–5), Eric Vaillancourt, Principal

Middle schools
Bloomfield Middle School (6–8), Amanda Massters, Principal

High schools
Bloomfield High School (9–12), Amy Shannon, Principal

Performance
The district's 89% graduation rate exceeds the State Standard of 55%.

District sports teams have won New York State championships in Boys Soccer, Girls Volleyball, Girls Basketball; Regional Championships in Boys Soccer, Girls Volleyball, Girls Basketball, Girls Soccer, Boys Basketball; and Sectional Championships in Girls track, Girls Bowling, Boys Bowling, Boys Soccer, Girls Volleyball, Girls Basketball, Girls Soccer, Boys Basketball.

References

External links
Bloomfield Central School District Website
New York State School Boards Association

School districts in New York (state)
Education in Ontario County, New York